Vestfossen Station is a railway station located at the village of Vestfossen in Øvre Eiker, Norway on the railway Sørlandet Line. The station is served by local train service L12 between Kongsberg via Oslo to Eidsvoll operated by Vy.

History
The station was opened in 1871 a branch line of Randsfjorden Line was opened between Hokksund and Kongsberg.

Railway stations in Øvre Eiker
Railway stations on the Sørlandet Line
Railway stations opened in 1871
1871 establishments in Norway